Shakespeare Bulletin is an academic journal founded in 1982. The journal focuses exclusively on performance studies and scholarly treatment of Shakespearean and early modern drama on stage and screen. Each issue contains original articles as well as theatre, film, and book reviews. Theatre coverage encompasses the United States, Canada, the United Kingdom, and many other countries. In 1992 the Bulletin incorporated the Shakespeare on Film Newsletter, which had been in publication since 1976. The current editor is Dr Peter Kirwan of Mary Baldwin University in the United States.

The journal is published quarterly in Spring, Summer, Fall, and Winter by the Johns Hopkins University Press. Annually, the journal publishes approximately 20 articles, 40-50 theatre/film reviews and a number of reviews of performance-oriented books.

Special issues have covered such issues as 'Shakespeare and Social Justice in Contemporary Performance', 'Labor in Contemporary Shakespeare Performance, the relationship between early modern drama and contemporary realist performance, and the work of Derek Jarman.

Essays are reviewed anonymously, and the journal has a series of published guidelines on best scholarly practice for transparent, supportive, and rigorous peer review and editing processes.

See also
Shakespeare's plays
English Renaissance theatre
Shakespeare on screen

References

External links
Shakespeare Bulletin official website
Shakespeare Bulletin at Project MUSE
Shakespeare Bulletin on Twitter 
Shakespeare Bulletin on Facebook

Literary magazines published in the United States
Shakespearean scholarship
Johns Hopkins University Press academic journals
Quarterly journals
English-language journals
Publications established in 1982
Shakespeare
1982 establishments in Maryland